The California State Games is an annual Olympic-style competition for California's amateur athletes of all ages and abilities. The Games is a member of the National Congress of State Games and of the United States Olympic Committee. Most of the events are held in locations throughout San Diego County (home of one of the USOC's three Olympic Training Center campuses) for both the Winter and Summer competitions. Skiing events held during the 2004 to 2007 Games took place at the June Mountain Ski Area in Mono County on the eastern slope of the Sierra Nevada.

Summer Games

Sporting events 

 Archery
 Badminton
 Baseball
 Basketball
 BMX
 Field Hockey
 Jr. Lifeguards
 Judo

 Pickleball
 Powerlifting
 Rugby
 Skateboarding
 Soccer
 Softball
 Surfing
 Swimming
 Synchronised swimming

 Table Tennis
 Track & Field (Youth)
 Track & Field (Adult)
 Water Polo
 Weightlifting
 Wrestling

Winter Games

Sporting events

Current events 

 Ice Hockey - Competition takes place in February

 Figure Skating - Competition takes place in March

 Gymnastics - Competition takes place in March

 Roller Skating - Competition takes place in March

Past Events 

 skiing

 snowboarding

References

External links
 California State Games

Multi-sport events in the United States
Sports competitions in California